Beroea was an ancient city of the Hellenistic period and Roman Empire in Macedonia.

Beroea or Berœa may also refer to:
 Aleppo or Beroea, a city in Syria
 Beroea of Epirus, ancient Greek princess

See also 
 Beroe (disambiguation)
 Veria, a city in northern Greece on the site of the ancient Beroea